Shahrokh Moshkin Ghalam or Shahrokh Moshkinghalam (Šâhrukh Muškîn-Qalam; born April 21, 1967 in Khorramshahr) is an Iranian modern dancer who lives and works in Paris. A graduate in history of art and theatre from the Paris 8 University, he is a choreographer, actor and director. He is also the founder and former artistic director of Nakissa Art Company. He is the first Iranian to be part of the prestigious Comédie-Française troupe.

Style
He was born In Iran but moved to Paris in his early teens.

Performed works
In 2002 the Royal Opera House of Covent Garden invited him to perform Seven Pavilion Ballet based on the works of great Persian poet Nezami. Dance Variations on Persian themes created in 2007 is his last work which is a collection of his best choreographies performed with Karine Gonzales the major dancer of his company.

Acting career 
For six years, he appeared under the direction of Ariane Mnouchkine with the Théâtre du Soleil and had major parts in plays such as Tartuffe, la Ville Parjure and  Les Atrides.  His theatre performances include Shakespeare's Twelfth Night with the Terrain Vague Company, Romeo and Juliet directed by Lionnel Briands, Dionysos, the Baccantes of Euripide directed by Usevio Lazaro, Soldier Tale of Strawinsky in theatre Athenée directed by Antoine Campo, A Streetcar Named Desire of Tennessee Williams directed by Phillip Adrian, and Bassa Selim in Mozart's Die Entführung aus dem Serail conducted by Marc Minkowski and directed by Jérôme Deschamps at the 2004 Festival d'Aix-en-Provence.

He has played and directed plays in Persian including:
Zohreh va Manouchehr by Iraj Mirza
Mardha va cheez from Makki
Kafane Siah a play inspired by Mirzadeh Eshghi the early 20th century Iranian poet.
 
2004 - 2011, he has been an official member of La Comédie Française, one of the most prestigious theatre companies in Europe and has taken part in plays including:
 
Pedro et le commandeur, Felix Lope de Vega
Molière / Lully: L'Amour médecin / Le Sicilien ou l'Amour peintre, conducted by William Christie, m.e.s Jean-Marie Villégier
La Maison des morts, Philippe Minyana, m.e.s Robert Cantarella,
Yerma le Bonheur, Cyrano de Bergerac and others all played in French

Personal life
He and his company Nakissa perform in various countries around the world and attend international festivals or events, such as the International Dance Festival in Boulder Colorado, Festival Meridas, Festival d'Asturias Festival de Chartres, Rotterdam, Rome, La haye, and the Tirgan festival in Toronto. In 2009 he signed an open letter of apology posted to Iranian.com along with 266 other Iranian academics, writers, artists, journalists about the persecution of Baháʼís.

See also
 Persian dance
 Comédie Française
 
 Les Archives du Spectale

References

Living people
Iranian male dancers
French people of Iranian descent
University of Paris alumni
Iranian male stage actors
French male stage actors
French male dancers
Male actors from Paris
French choreographers
Iranian directors
French directors
1967 births